Polygoniodes is a genus of moths of the family Erebidae. The genus was erected by George Hampson in 1926.

Species
Polygoniodes furva Schaus, 1912
Polygoniodes laciniata (Felder & Rogenhofer, 1874)
Polygoniodes pallidipes Schaus, 1911
Polygoniodes terraba Schaus, 1911

References

Calpinae